Union Gas was a major Canadian natural gas company based in Ontario. Its distribution arm serviced approximately 1.5 million customers in northern, southwestern and eastern Ontario. Union Gas has been a subsidiary of Enbridge since February 2017, when former parent Spectra Energy merged into Enbridge. 

Union Gas Limited and Enbridge Gas Distribution merged under the corporate name Enbridge Gas Inc. on January 1, 2019. Enbridge has since begun to gradually phase out the Union Gas name in favour of its corporate brand.

In addition to natural gas service, Union Gas formerly rented gas-powered water heaters to residential customers; this operation was separated into a sister company, Union Energy, in 1999. Union Energy was acquired by outside interests in 2001, and is now known as Reliance Home Comfort.

References

External links
 

1911 establishments in Ontario
Companies based in Ontario
Companies formerly listed on the Toronto Stock Exchange
Enbridge
Energy companies established in 1911
Natural gas companies of Canada
Non-renewable resource companies established in 1911
Canadian companies established in 1911